The 2007–08 Slovak Superliga (known as the Slovak Corgoň Liga for sponsorship reasons) was the 15th season of first-tier football league in Slovakia, since its establishment in 1993. This season started on 14 July 2007 and ended on 31 May 2008. MŠK Žilina are the defending champions.

Teams
A total of 12 teams was contested in the league, including 12 sides from the 2006–07 season and one promoted from the 1. Liga via play-off.

Relegation for FK Inter Bratislava to the 2007–08 1. Liga was confirmed on 30 May 2007. The one relegated team were replaced by FC ViOn Zlaté Moravce.

Stadiums and locations

League table

Results

First and second round

Third round

Season statistics

Top scorers

See also
2007–08 Slovak Cup
2007–08 Slovak First League

References

External links
RSSSF.org (Tables and statistics)

Slovak
Slovak Super Liga seasons
1